This is an alphabetical list of songs written or co–written by the American songwriter David Lee Murphy.

"Song" – Artist(s) (co–writers)

0–9

A
"Ain't Dead Yet" – Kevin Fowler
"Ain't Much Left of Me" - Blackberry Smoke
"All Lit Up in Love" – David Lee Murphy
"Always the Love Songs" – Eli Young Band
"Anywhere with You" - Jake Owen
"Are You Gonna Kiss Me or Not" - Thompson Square

B
"Bar at the End of the World" – Kenny Chesney
"Beer or Gasoline" – Chris Young
"Better Than This" – Brad Paisley
"Big Green Tractor" – Jason Aldean
"Blind Desire" – Danny Tate
"Breakfast in Birmingham" – David Lee Murphy
"Broken Windshield View" - Chris Lane
"Bump in The Road" - Greg Hanna

C
"Can't Turn It Off" – David Lee Murphy
"Center of My World" – Chris Young
"Custom Made" – Andy Griggs

D
"Dixie Boy Special" – The Lost Trailers
"Dust on the Bottle" – David Lee Murphy

E
"Every Time I Get Around You" – David Lee Murphy
"Everything I Shouldn't Be Thinking About" — Thompson Square
 Even the Stars Fall 4 You — Keith Urban
 Everything's Gonna Be Alright - David Lee Murphy/Kenny Chesney

F
"Fast Horse" – Trick Pony
"A Feelin' Like That" – Gary Allan
"Fish Ain't Bitin'" – David Lee Murphy

G
"Genuine Rednecks" – David Lee Murphy
"Goes Down Easy" – Van Zant
"Good One Comin' On" – Trent Willmon/Blackberry Smoke
"Greatest Show on Earth" – David Lee Murphy

H
"Hangin' On" – David Lee Murphy
"Henpecked Hero" – Killer Beaz
"High Weeds and Rust" – Doug Stone, David Lee Murphy
"Hillbilly Blues" – Trick Pony
"Happy Man" – Trace Adkins

I
"I Break Everything I Touch" – Jason Aldean
"I Can Live with That" – Trick Pony
"I Pick My Parties" – Montgomery Gentry with Toby Keith
"If It's the Last Thing I Do" –James Otto, Brooks & Dunn, Montgomery Gentry
"It's Only Money" – Van Zant

J
"Just Don't Wait Around Til She's Leavin'" – David Lee Murphy
"Just Enough to Get in Trouble" – Hank Williams, Jr.
"Just Not Today" – Kenny Chesney
"Just Once" – David Lee Murphy

K
"Kinda Like It" – Adam Brand

L
"Live a Little — Kenny Chesney
"Living in Fast Forward" – Kenny Chesney
"Loco" – David Lee Murphy
"Lonesome USA" – Jason Aldean

M
"Mama 'n Them" – David Lee Murphy
"Million Dollar View" - Trace Adkins
"The More I Drink" – Blake Shelton
"Muddy Up the Water" – Danny Tate

N
"Nobody's Perfect" – Danny Tate
"Nothin's Gonna Slow Me Down" - Adam Brand
"Now You're Talkin'" –Kevin Fowler, Montgomery Gentry

O
"On a Mission" – Trick Pony
"The Only Way I Know" – Jason Aldean with Luke Bryan & Eric Church
"Out with a Bang" – David Lee Murphy

P
"Party Crowd" – David Lee Murphy
"Party Till the Money's All Gone" – Adam Brand
"People Like Us" – Aaron Tippin
"Pirate Flag" — Kenny Chesney
"Pound Sign (#?*!)" - Kevin Fowler

R
Red Roses Won't Work Now  Reba McEntire
"The Road You Leave Behind" – David Lee Murphy

S
"Santa's Team" – Killer Beaz
"Scatter the Ashes" – Chris LeDoux
"She Means Everything To Me" - Greg Hanna
"She's Really Something to See" – David Lee Murphy
"Somebody Needs a Hug" — Keith Anderson
"Spent" – Trick Pony
"Stayin' Alive" – Danny Tate
 Sweet Little Something – Jason Aldean

T
"Til It's Gone" - Kenny Chesney
"Time in a Bottle" – John Berry
"Trouble With a Woman" – Rhett Akins

U

V

W
"We Can't All Be Angels" – David Lee Murphy
"What's Not to Love" – Trick Pony 
"What Kind Of Love Are You On" - Greg Hanna
"Why Can't People Just Get Along" – David Lee Murphy
"Will You Marry Me?" – John Berry
"Winnebago" – Kenny Chesney
"Without a Doubt" – Betsy Hammer
"Way Out Here" - Josh Thompson

X

Y

Z

References

Murphy, David Lee